The National Aquatics Centre, and colloquially known as the Water Cube and the Ice Cube, is an aquatics center at the Olympic Green in Beijing, China.

The facility was originally constructed to host the aquatics competitions at the 2008 Summer Olympics and Paralympics. During the Olympics — where it hosted diving, swimming and synchronized swimming events — 25 world records were broken in swimming. In July 2010, a renovation of the facility was completed, which included the addition of a  public water park.

With Beijing being awarded the 2022 Winter Olympics, the Water Cube became known as the Ice Cube as part of the Water Cube was renovated in 2019 to allow the hosting of curling events.

Architecture
In July 2003 the Water Cube design was chosen from 10 proposals in an international architectural competition for the aquatic center project.
The Water Cube was specially designed and built by a consortium made up of PTW Architects (an Australian architecture firm), Arup international engineering group, CSCEC (China State Construction Engineering Corporation), and CCDI (China Construction Design International) of Shanghai. The Water Cube's design was initiated by a team effort: the Chinese partners felt a square was more symbolic to Chinese culture and its relationship to the Bird's Nest stadium while the Sydney-based partners came up with the idea of covering the 'cube' with bubbles, symbolizing water. Contextually, the Cube symbolizes Earth, while the circle (represented by the elliptic stadium) represents heaven, a common motif in ancient Chinese art.

Comprising a steel space frame, it is the largest ETFE-clad structure in the world with over 100,000 m² of ETFE pillows that are only 0.2 mm (1/125 of an inch) in total thickness.  The ETFE cladding, supplied and installed by the firm Vector Foiltec, allows more light and heat penetration than traditional glass, resulting in a 30% decrease in energy costs. This choice was made in view of Beijing's goal of presenting a fully "green" Olympic Games, with zero net growth in total carbon emissions. Likewise, the venue was also designed to "capture and recycle 80% of the water falling on the roof or lost from the pools."

The outer wall is based on the Weaire–Phelan structure, a structure devised from the natural pattern of bubbles in soap lather. In the true Weaire–Phelan structure the edge of each cell is curved in order to maintain 109.5 degree angles at each vertex (satisfying Plateau's rules), but of course as a structural support system each beam was required to be straight so as to better resist axial compression. The complex Weaire–Phelan pattern was developed by slicing through bubbles in soap foam, resulting in more irregular, organic patterns than foam bubble structures proposed earlier by the scientist Kelvin.

The structure had a capacity of 17,000 during the games. The building's popularity has spawned many copycat structures throughout China. For example, there is one-to-one copy of the facade near the ferry terminal in Macau – the Casino Oceanus by Paul Steelman.

2008 Summer Olympics

The Aquatics Center hosted the swimming, diving, and synchronized swimming events during the Olympics. Water polo was originally planned to be hosted in the venue but was moved to the Ying Tung Natatorium.

Many people believed the Water Cube to be the fastest Olympic pool in the world. Over the course of the Games, 25 world records were broken by athletes at the Water Cube, although all but two of them were achieved by swimmers wearing the controversial LZR Racer bodyskin (which led to restrictions on the use of such suits being implemented by FINA in 2010).

Post-2008 Olympics usage and legacy

After the Olympics, the Water Cube was opened to the public on select days of the week beginning in June 2009, and was also used as the site for a production of Swan Lake among other shows. On 19 October 2009, the Water Cube was closed to the public to begin a renovation of a portion of the complex into a water park, led by Canadian design firm Forrec, promising "seven-story water slides and a wave machine, as well as attractions for the more land inclined such as shopping centers, cafes, and performance stages."

The facility officially reopened on 28 July 2010, with the water park opening on 8 August 2010 (the second anniversary of the Games' opening). The renovation divided the facility into three pool areas (a main pool, Olympic "demonstration" pool, and a training pool), as well as the  water park area.

In July 2013, the Water Cube introduced a new LED light show on its exterior, "Nature and Man in Rhapsody of Light", by artist Jennifer Wen Ma and lighting designer Zheng Jiawei. Its colors are determined by trending use of emoji on Sina Weibo, which is in turn used to calculate the "mood" of the Chinese public 

In 2018, it was reported that the venue had achieved revenues of 124 million yuan (about $18 million USD), and has been breaking even for years.

2022 Winter Olympics

The Water Cube has been hosting the curling events during the 2022 Winter Olympics and Paralympics, a configuration nicknamed the "Ice Cube". After Beijing was awarded the Games, work began on renovations to the facility to allow it to be converted to a curling rink, including the addition of ice-making equipment and other necessary climate control and monitoring systems.

It hosted its first event in this configuration, the China Junior Curling Open, in December 2019.

Awards

 2004: Venice Biennale – Award for most accomplished work Atmosphere section
 2006: Popular Science Best of what's new 2006 in engineering
 2008: NSW Project of the Year award from the Australian Institute of Project Management
 2009: 40th annual MacRobert Award, the UK's biggest prize for engineering innovation
 2010: International Association for Bridge and Structural Engineering 2010 Outstanding Structure Award

See also 

Frei Otto
Chris Bosse
Rob Leslie-Carter
Swimming at the 2008 Summer Olympics
Swimming at the 2008 Summer Paralympics
Curling at the 2022 Winter Olympics
Wheelchair curling at the 2022 Winter Paralympics
Timothy Schreiber

References

External links

Official website
National Aquatics Center (Water Cube)
Science News article describing the design of the building and the mathematics behind it
News and Project Information on the Watercube, Beijing
The Water Cube's creation process

Venues of the 2008 Summer Olympics
Venues of the 2022 Winter Olympics
Contemporary Chinese architecture
High-tech architecture
Olympic diving venues
Olympic swimming venues
Olympic synchronized swimming venues
Olympic curling venues
Sports venues in Beijing
Swimming venues in China
Articles containing video clips
Water parks
Sports venues completed in 2008
Buildings and structures in Chaoyang District, Beijing